KPKE (1490 AM, The Peak) is a radio station broadcasting a country music music format. Licensed to Gunnison, Colorado, United States, the station is currently owned by John Harvey Rees and features programming from Dial Global and Fox News Radio.

History
The station was assigned the call letters KAON on 1996-01-19.  On 1996-02-05, the station changed its call sign to the current KPKE.

References

External links

PKE